This is an alphabetical list of environmental issues, harmful aspects of human activity on the biophysical environment. They are loosely divided into causes, effects and mitigation, noting that effects are interconnected and can cause new effects.

Issues
 Greenhouse gas emissions — Coal-fired power station • Carbon dioxide • Methane • Fluorinated gases
 Human population — Biocapacity • climate change • Carrying capacity • Exploitation • Industrialisation • I = PAT • Land degradation • Land reclamation • Optimum population • Overshoot (population) • Population density • Population density • Population dynamics • Population growth • Projections of population growth • Total fertility rate • Urbanization • Waste • Water conflict • Water scarcity • Overdrafting
 Hydrology — Environmental impacts of reservoirs • Tile drainage • Hydrology (agriculture) • Flooding • Landslide 
 Intensive farming — Agricultural subsidy • Barn fires • Environmental effects of meat production • Intensive animal farming • Intensive crop farming • Irrigation • Monoculture • Nutrient pollution • Overgrazing • Pesticide drift • Plasticulture • Slash-and-burn • Tile drainage • Zoonosis
 Land use — Built environment • Desertification • Habitat fragmentation • Habitat destruction • Land degradation • Land pollution • Lawn-environmental concerns • Trail ethics • Urban heat island • Urban sprawl
 Nanotechnology — Impact of nanotechnology
 Natural disasters
 Nuclear issues — Nuclear fallout • Nuclear meltdown • Nuclear power • Nuclear weapons • Nuclear and radiation accidents • Nuclear safety • High-level radioactive waste management 
 Ocean trash — Garbage patch • Ghost net • Washed Ashore
 Water pollution

Effects
 Climate change — Global warming • Global dimming • Fossil fuels • Sea level rise • Greenhouse gas • Ocean acidification • Shutdown of thermohaline circulation • Environmental impact of the coal industry • Urban heat islands • Flooding
 Environmental degradation — Loss of biodiversity • Habitat destruction • Invasive species
 Environmental health — Air quality • Asthma • Birth defect • Developmental disability • Endocrine disruptors • Environmental impact of the coal industry • Environmental impact of nanotechnology • Electromagnetic field • Electromagnetic radiation and health • Indoor air quality • Lead poisoning • Leukemia • Nanotoxicology • Nature deficit disorder • One Health • Sick Building Syndrome • Environmental impact of hydraulic fracturing
 Environmental issues with energy — Environmental impact of the coal industry • Environmental impact of the energy industry • Environmental impact of hydraulic fracturing
 Environmental impact of transport
 Environmental impact of aviation
 Environmental impact of the petroleum industry — Exhaust gas • Waste tires • Motor vehicle emissions and pregnancy • Externalities of automobiles
 Environmental impact of shipping (Cruise ships in Europe • Cruise ships in the United States)
 Environmental issues with war — Agent Orange • Depleted uranium • Military Superfund site (Category only) • Scorched earth • War and environmental law • Unexploded ordnance
 Overpopulation — Burial • Overpopulation in companion animals • Tragedy of the commons • Gender Imbalance in Developing Countries • Sub-replacement fertility levels in developed countries
 Mutation breeding — Genetic pollution
 Synthetic biology — Synthetic DNA • Artificially Expanded Genetic Information System • Hachimoji DNA
 Genetically modified food — Genetically modified crops • Genetically modified livestock • Genetically modified food controversies
 Pollution — Nonpoint source pollution • Point source pollution

Air pollution — Environmental impact of the coal industry • Environmental impact of hydraulic fracturing • Indoor air quality • Smog • Tropospheric ozone • Volatile organic compound • Atmospheric particulate matter CFC • Biological effects of UV exposure
Light pollution • Visual pollution
 Noise pollution 
Soil pollution — Alkali soil • Brownfield • Residual sodium carbonate index • Soil conservation • Soil erosion • Soil contamination • Soil salination • Superfund • Superfund sites
Water pollution — Acid rain • Agricultural runoff • Algal bloom • Environmental impact of the coal industry • Environmental impact of hydraulic fracturing • Eutrophication • Fish kill • Groundwater pollution • Groundwater recharge • Marine debris • Marine pollution • Mercury in fish • Microplastics • Nutrient pollution • Ocean acidification • Ocean dumping • Oil spills • Soda lake • Ship pollution • Thermal pollution • Urban runoff • Wastewater
 Space debris • Interplanetary contamination • Ozone depletion
 Resource depletion — Exploitation of natural resources • Overdrafting (groundwater) • Overexploitation
Consumerism — Consumer capitalism • Planned obsolescence • Over-consumption
Fishing — Blast fishing • Bottom trawling • Cyanide fishing • Ghost nets • Illegal, unreported and unregulated fishing • Overfishing • Shark culling • Shark finning • Whaling
Logging — Clearcutting • Deforestation • Illegal logging
Mining — Acid mine drainage • Environmental impact of hydraulic fracturing • Mountaintop removal mining • Slurry impoundments
Water (depletion) — Anoxic waters • Aral Sea • California Water Wars • Dead Sea • Lake Chad • Water scarcity
 Toxicants — Agent Orange • Asbestos • Beryllium • Bioaccumulation • Biomagnification • Chlorofluorocarbons (CFCs) • Cyanide • DDT • Endocrine disruptors • Explosives • Environmental impact of the coal industry • Herbicides • Hydrocarbons • Perchlorate • Pesticides • Persistent organic pollutant • PBBs • PBDEs • Toxic heavy metals • PCB • Dioxin • Polycyclic aromatic hydrocarbons • Radioactive contamination • Volatile organic compounds
 Waste — Electronic waste • Great Pacific Garbage Patch • Illegal dumping • Incineration • Litter • Waste disposal incidents • Marine debris • Medical waste • Landfill • Leachate • Toxic waste • Environmental impact of the coal industry • Exporting of hazardous waste

Mitigation
 Mitigation of aviation's environmental impact – Aviation taxation and subsidies (Air passenger tax • Kerosene tax) • Electric aircraft • High-speed rail
 Conservation
 Ecosystems — Anoxic waters • Biodiversity • Biosecurity • Coral bleaching • Black carbon • Edge effect • Habitat destruction • Organic farming • Habitat fragmentation • In-situ leach
 Fishing — Blast fishing • Bottom trawling • By-catch • Cetacean bycatch • Gillnetting • Illegal, unreported and unregulated fishing • Environmental effects of fishing • Marine pollution • Overfishing • Whaling
 Forests — Clearcutting • Deforestation • reforestation and afforestation • Illegal logging • Trail ethics
 Natural resources — Resource depletion • Exploitation of natural resources • Steady-state economy • Waste hierarchy
 Species — Endangered species • Genetic diversity • Habitat destruction • Holocene extinction • Invasive species • Poaching • Pollinator decline • Species extinction • Threshold host density • Wildlife trade • Wildlife disease 
 Energy conservation — Alternatives to car use • Efficient energy use • Carfree city • Energy hierarchy • Local food
 Renewable energy — Renewable energy commercialization
 Recreation — Protected areas
 Water conservation
 Disaster mitigation
 Environmental law — Environmental crime • Environmental justice • Polluter pays principle • Precautionary principle • Regulatory capture • Trail ethics
 Phase-out of fossil fuel vehicles
 Environmental aspects of the electric car
 Hydrogen economy
 Rail electrification
 Scrappage program
 Vehicle recycling
 Phase-out of single-use plastics
 Phase-out of lightweight plastic bags (Australia • United States) • Biodegradable bags • Reusable shopping bag • Shopping trolley (caddy)
 Bottled water ban — Reuse of bottles
 Plastic straw ban
 Sustainable agriculture
 Nutrition transition — Cellular agriculture (cultured meat) • Plant-based diet (reducitarianism • veganism • vegetarianism)

See also 
 Citizen Science, cleanup projects that people can take part in.
 Environmental history
 Environmental history of Latin America
 Environmentalism
 Environmental racism
 Environmental racism in Europe
 Index of environmental articles
 List of conservation topics
 List of environmental disasters
 List of environmental organizations
 List of population concern organizations
 List of sustainability topics
 Lists of environmental topics
 List of environmental organisations topics
 Millennium Ecosystem Assessment

External links 

 Environmental Issues and Research Topics | AurumScience.com
 Environmental Issues | GlobalIssues.com
 Human Activities that affect the Environment | The Energy Physics
 Environmental Threats That We are Going to Face | The Energy Physics (causes and effects)
 Millennium Ecosystem Assessment

List of environmental issues

Environmental issues
Environmental issues